Hippaphesis is a genus of beetles in the family Cerambycidae, containing the following species:

 Hippaphesis granicornis (Fairmaire, 1879)
 Hippaphesis punctata Thomson, 1864

References

Apomecynini
Cerambycidae genera